The Greece national korfball team is managed by the Hellenic Korfball & Ball-Sports Federation (HKBSF), representing Greece in korfball international competitions.

Tournament history

Current squad
National team in the 2013 European Bowl

 Coach: Angelos Kokolakis

References 

National korfball teams
Korfball
Korfball in Greece